James Day was an English verse-writer whose name and writings are but little known.

Works 
James Day was the author of a 1637 volume of devotional verse, entitled A New Spring of Divine Poetrie, 4to, with an acrostic dedication "To Mistris Bridget Rudge" and commendatory verses by H. G. and T. J. This little volume, perhaps the sole production of his poetical muse, consists of 48 pages, and of divers poems. The first is "The World's Metamorphosis"; it describes the creation of the earth. The second is "Christ's Birth and Passion". These are followed by some shorter poems, which, according to Arthur Henry Bullen, "have more conceit than elegance". 

F. W. Fairholt calls the work  "A thin quarto of melancholy morality and pointless attempts at religious wit, after the fashion of Quarles." For example, he ends his "Meditation on a Windmill" with the lines—

Identity 
Though only J. Day is on his title-page, that the author's name was James appears by one of the commendatory verses prefixed by H. G. From the commendatory verses it appears that the book was a youthful production.

References

Sources 

  
 Bullen, A. H. & Steggle, Matthew (2004). "Day, James (fl. 1637), poet". Oxford Dictionary of National Biography. Oxford University Press. Accessed 29 June 2022.
 Fairholt, F. W., ed. (1849). Satirical Songs and Poems on Costume: From the 13th to the 19th Century. London: The Percy Society. p. 143.
 "J. M.". (December 1849). "Retrospective Review.—New Spring of Divine Poetrie". The Gentleman's Magazine. Vol. 186. pp. 606–608.

17th-century English poets